A troglobite (or, formally, troglobiont) is an animal species, or population of a species, strictly bound to underground habitats, such as caves. These are separate from species that mainly live in above-ground habitats but are also able to live underground (eutroglophiles), and species that are only cave visitors (subtroglophiles and trogloxenes).  Land-dwelling troglobites may be referred to as troglofauna, while aquatic species may be called stygofauna, although for these animals the term stygobite is preferable.

Troglobites typically have evolutionary adaptations to cave life. Examples of such adaptations include slow metabolism, reduced energy consumption, better food usage efficiency, decrease or loss of eyesight (anophthalmia), and depigmentation (absence of pigment in the integument). Conversely, as opposed to lost or reduced functions, many species have evolved elongated antenna and locomotory appendages, in order to better move around and respond to environmental stimuli. These structures are also full of chemical, tactile and humidity receptors. Troglobites commonly do not survive well outside caves and therefore cannot travel between separate cave systems. As a result, many troglobiotic species are endemic to a single cave or system of caves.

Not all cave dwelling species are considered to be troglobites. An animal found in an underground environment may be a troglophile (a species living both in subterranean and in epigean habitats, e.g. bats and cave swallows) or a trogloxene (a species only occurring sporadically in a hypogean habitat and unable to establish a subterranean population).

Flatworms
Hausera hauseri

Mollusca

Tumbling Creek cavesnail (Antrobia culveri)
Cave physa (Physella spelunca)
Phantom cave snail (Cochliopa texana)
Mimic cavesnail (Phreatodrobia imitata)
 Zospeum
Tashan cave snail (Trogloiranica tashanica)
 Cecilioides

Velvet worms
 White cave velvet worm (Peripatopsis alba)
 Speleoperipatus spelaeus

Arthropoda

Arachnida
Kauaʻi cave wolf spider (Adelocosa anops)
Nelson cave spider (Spelungula cavernicola)
Calicina cloughensis
Texella reddelli
Trogloraptor marchingtoni
Apochthonius mysterius – Mystery Cave pseudoscorpion
Apochthonius typhlus – Stone County cave pseudoscorpion
Hesperochernes occidentalis – guano pseudoscorpion
Mundochthonius cavernicolus – cavernicolous pseudoscorpion
Phanetta subterranea – cave spider
Porrhomma cavernicola – cavernicolous Porrhomma spider
Porrhomma rosenhaueri – A blind cave Spider (very rare)
Sinopoda scurion – eyeless huntsman spider
Aops oncodactylus – Barrow Island cave scorpion
Troglokhammouanus steineri – Xe Bang Fai cave scorpion
Vietbocap lao – Nam Lot cave scorpion
Hormurus polisorum – Christmas Island cave scorpion
Parobisium yosemite – Yosemite cave pseudoscorpion
Titanobochica magna – cave pseudoscorpion
Cicurina madla – Madla Cave meshweaver
Chinquipellobunus madlae – cave harvestman
Stalita taenaria
Mesostalita nocturna
Chthonius
Neobisium maritimum
Agraecina cristiani - Movile Cave spider

Myriapoda
Millipedes 
Causeyella species
Chaetaspis aleyorum – Aleys' cave millipede
Chersoiulus sphinx
Desmoxytes
Mammamia profuga
Polydesmus subterraneus
Sinocallipus
Titanophyllum spiliarum
Trichopetalum whitei
Tingupa pallida
Zosteractis interminata

Centipedes
Cryptops speleorex
Eupolybothrus cavernicolus
Scolopocryptops troglocaudatus

Crustacea
Crayfish

Others

Allocrangonyx hubrichti – Hubricht's long-tailed amphipod
Andhracoides shabuddin– Guthikonda cave isopod
Andhracoides gebaueri– Belum cave isopod
Androniscus dentiger – rosy woodlouse
Alpioniscus strasseri
Bactrurus brachycaudus – short-tailed groundwater amphipod
Bactrurus hubrichti – sword-tail cave amphipod
Bactrurus pseudomucronatus – false sword-tailed cave amphipod
Barburia yanezi
Caecidotea antricola – cave isopod
Caecidotea dimorpha – Missouri cave isopod
Caecidotea fustis – Fustis cave isopod
Caecidotea salemensis – Salem cave isopod
Caecidotea serrata – serrated cave isopod
Caecidotea stiladactyla – slender-fingered cave isopod
Caecidotea stygia – stygian cave isopod
Cancrocaeca
Cerberusa caeca
Chaceus caecus
Cyclops vernalis
Diacyclops yeatmani – Yeatman's groundwater copepod
Gammarus acherondytes – Illinois cave amphipod
Holoped amazonicum
Lirceus usdagalun  – Lee County cave isopod
Macromaxillocaris
Munidopsis polymorpha - Blind albino cave crab
Niphargus species
Orcovita hickski
Orcovita orchardorum
Palaemonias alabamae - Alabama cave shrimp
Palaemonias ganteri - Kentucky cave shrimp
Phasmon typhlops
Samarplax principe
Spelaeorchestia koloana
Speocirolana
Stygiocaris
Stygobromus barri – Barr's groundwater amphipod
Stygobromus clantoni – Clanton's groundwater amphipod
Stygobromus heteropodus – Pickle Springs amphipod
Stygobromus onondagaensis – Onondaga cave amphipod
Stygobromus ozarkensis – Ozark cave amphipod
Stygobromus putedus – Wisconsin groundwater amphipod
Stygobromus subtilis – subtle groundwater amphipod
Teretamon spelaeum
Troglocaris
Typhlatya
Typhlocaris
Typhlocirolana
Typhlopseudothelphusa
Villalobosius lopezformenti
Yucatalana

Insecta
See Cave insects

Fish

List of cave fish

Amphibians
Cave salamanders

Mammals
There are no known mammals that live exclusively in caves. Most bats sleep in caves during the day and hunt at night, but they are considered troglophiles or trogloxenes. However some fossorials which spend their whole lives underground might be considered subterranean fauna, although they are not true troglofauna as they do not live in caves.

Echinodermata
 Asterinides sp.
 Copidaster cavernicola - Cozumel's cave sea star
 Ophionereis commutabilis

Porifera
 Eunapius subterraneus
 Racekiela cavernicola

Annelida

 Erpobdella borisi
 Erpobdella mestrovi
 Haemopis caeca

See also
Subterranean fauna
Troglofauna

References

Cave animals
Troglobites